Cannabidiol (CBD) is a phytocannabinoid discovered in 1940. It is one of 113 identified cannabinoids in cannabis plants, along with tetrahydrocannabinol (THC), and accounts for up to 40% of the plant's extract. , clinical research on CBD included studies related to anxiety, cognition, movement disorders, and pain, but there is insufficient high-quality evidence that cannabidiol is effective for these conditions. Nevertheless, CBD is a herbal dietary supplement promoted with unproven claims of particular therapeutic effects. The global market size for CBD was predicted to exceed billion by 2028.

Cannabidiol can be taken internally in multiple ways, including by inhaling cannabis smoke or vapor, oral, and as an aerosol spray into the cheek. It may be supplied as CBD oil containing only CBD as the active ingredient (excluding THC or terpenes), CBD-dominant hemp extract oil, capsules, dried cannabis, or prescription liquid solution. CBD does not have the same psychoactivity as THC, and can negate the psychoactive effects of THC on the body if both are present. CBD heated to 250–300 °C may partially be converted into THC.

, the mechanism of action for its biological effects had not been determined. Unlike THC, which acts on the cannabinoid receptor type 1 (CB1) as a partial agonist, CBD instead is a negative allosteric modulator of CB1 receptors.

In the United States, the cannabidiol drug Epidiolex was approved by the Food and Drug Administration in 2018 for the treatment of two epilepsy disorders. While the 2018 United States Farm Bill removed hemp and hemp extracts (including CBD) from the Controlled Substances Act, the marketing and sale of CBD formulations for medical use or as an ingredient in dietary supplements or manufactured foods remains illegal under FDA regulation, .

Medical uses

Cannabidiol is the generic name of the drug and its .

Research
, there was limited high-quality evidence for cannabidiol having a neurological effect in humans.

Epilepsy

In the United States, the FDA has indicated only one brand of prescription cannabidiol called Epidiolex for the treatment of seizures associated with Dravet syndrome, Lennox–Gastaut syndrome, or tuberous sclerosis complex in people one year of age and older. While Epidiolex treatment is generally well tolerated, it is associated with minor adverse effects, such as gastrointestinal upset, decreased appetite, lethargy, sleepiness and poor sleep quality.

In the European Union, cannabidiol (Epidyolex) is indicated for use as adjunctive therapy of seizures associated with Lennox–Gastaut syndrome or Dravet syndrome, in conjunction with clobazam, for people two years of age and older. In 2020, the label for Epidiolex in the US was expanded to include seizures associated with tuberous sclerosis complex. Epidiolex/Epidyolex is the first prescription formulation of plant-derived cannabidiol approved by regulatory bodies in the US and Europe.

Other uses
Research on other uses for cannabidiol includes several neurological disorders, but the findings have not been confirmed to establish such uses in clinical practice. In October 2019, the FDA issued an advisory warning that the effects of CBD during pregnancy or breastfeeding are unknown, indicating that the safety, doses, interactions with other drugs or foods, and side effects of CBD are not clinically defined, and may pose a risk to the mother and infant.

Many claims are made for the therapeutic benefit of cannabidiol that are not backed by sound evidence. Some claims, such as treatment of cancer, are pseudoscience.

In 2020, the label for Epidiolex in the US was expanded to include treatment of seizures associated with tuberous sclerosis.

Non-intoxicating effects
Cannabidiol does not appear to have any intoxicating effects such as those caused by ∆-THC in cannabis, but it is under preliminary research for its possible anti-anxiety and anti-psychotic effects. As the legal landscape and understanding about the differences in medical cannabinoids unfolds, experts are working to distinguish "medical cannabis" (with varying degrees of psychotropic effects and deficits in executive function) from "medical CBD therapies", which would commonly present as having a reduced or non-psychoactive side-effect profile.

Various strains of "medical cannabis" are found to have a significant variation in the ratios of CBD-to-THC and are known to contain other non-psychotropic cannabinoids. Any psychoactive cannabis, regardless of its CBD content, is derived from the flower (or bud) of the genus Cannabis. As defined by US federal law, non-psychoactive hemp (also commonly termed "industrial hemp"), regardless of its CBD content, is any part of the cannabis plant, whether growing or not, containing a ∆-tetrahydrocannabinol concentration of no more than 0.3% on a dry-weight basis. Certain standards are required for legal growing, cultivating, and producing the hemp plant, but there are no federal standards for quality being enforced in the hemp industry. Certain state regulations are in place, but vary state to state. For instance, the Colorado Industrial Hemp Program registers growers of industrial hemp and samples crops to verify that the dry-weight THC concentration does not exceed 0.3%.

Side effects
Research indicates that cannabidiol may reduce adverse effects of THC, particularly those causing intoxication and sedation, but only at high doses. Safety studies of cannabidiol showed it is well tolerated, but may cause tiredness, somnolence, sedation, diarrhea, or changes in appetite as common adverse effects with the most common being somnolence and sedation. Side effects of CBD are dose related. Epidiolex documentation lists sleepiness, insomnia and poor quality sleep, decreased appetite, diarrhea, and fatigue.

Potential interactions
Laboratory evidence indicated that cannabidiol may reduce THC clearance, increasing plasma concentrations which may raise THC availability to receptors and enhance its effect in a dose-dependent manner. In vitro, cannabidiol inhibited the activity of voltage-dependent sodium and potassium channels, which may affect neural activity. A recent study using X-ray crystallography showed that CBD binds inside the sodium channel pore at a novel site at the interface of the fenestrations and the central hydrophobic cavity of the channel. Binding at this site blocks the transmembrane-spanning sodium ion translocation pathway, providing a molecular mechanism for channel inhibition, which could contribute to a reduced excitability. A small clinical trial reported that CBD partially inhibited the CYP2C-catalyzed hydroxylation of THC to 11-OH-THC. Little is known about potential drug interactions, but CBD mediates a decrease in clobazam metabolism. Work with human liver microsomes shows that cannabidiol inhibits CYP3A5 and CYP3A4 to some degree.

Veterinary medicine

Research
The number of research projects and scientific publications on cannabidiol and other cannabinoids in pets surged in the late 2010s; nonetheless, there were no hemp-derived, cannabinoid-rich registered veterinary medicinal products in any of the major regions (see #Legal status).

In the US and other territories there are, however, numerous veterinary nutraceutical products available over the counter (OTC). The lack of clarity in the regulations governing veterinary hemp food supplements allows for products of questionable quality to flood the market, which may pose a risk to the wellbeing of pets and owners.

To understand better the benefits of CBD and associated compounds for the quality of life of animals, companies specialized in CBD products for animals have been funding research projects.

Canine osteoarthritis
CBD's ability to help regulate the endocannabinoid system and reduce the release of excitatory neurotransmitters could result in a retrograde inhibitory signal that lessens chronic pain responses. Studies in dogs with chronic pain associated with osteoarthritis showed an increase in level of activity in animals receiving CBD-rich food supplements.

Epilepsy
From the results seen in humans with drugs such as Epidiolex and Sativex in scientific studies and reviews, it could be expected that CBD-based products would be helpful to manage seizures in dogs. However, despite the numerous case reports presented by veterinary neurologists supporting the benefits of CBD as adjunctive therapy, published controlled studies have not shown a statistically significant decrease in the number of seizures across the groups receiving CBD. Further research in this area is required before any clear conclusion can be drawn.

Pharmacokinetics
The oral bioavailability of CBD varies greatly across species and it is linked to the presentation and the time of administration. A 24-hour kinetic examination in dogs showed that the absorption of the cannabidiolic acid (CBDA) does occur, and that this molecule is absorbed least twice as well as CBD post oral ingestion.

It was found that the major metabolites of CBD in humans (7-OH-CBD and 7-COOH-CBD) are not prevalent in dogs, while 6-OH-CBD was found to be the primary metabolite in dogs receiving a CBD-enriched cannabis-derived herbal extract, suggesting that canine and human CBD metabolic route might be somewhat different.

Pharmacology

Pharmacodynamics
Cannabidiol has low affinity for the cannabinoid CB and CB receptors, although it acts as an antagonist of CB/CB agonists, despite this low affinity. The core effect of antagonism of CB receptors is reduced binding affinity of THC and any of its related isomers. Cannabidiol may be an antagonist of GPR55, a G protein-coupled receptor and putative cannabinoid receptor that is expressed in the caudate nucleus and putamen in the brain. It also may act as an inverse agonist of GPR3, GPR6, and GPR12. CBD has been shown to act as a serotonin 5-HT receptor partial agonist. At higher concentrations, CBD acts as an inverse agonist of 5-HT receptors. It is an allosteric modulator of the μ- and δ-opioid receptors as well. The pharmacological effects of CBD may involve PPARγ agonism, inhibition of voltage-gated cation channels, and intracellular calcium release.

Pharmacokinetics
The oral bioavailability of cannabidiol is approximately 6% in humans, while its bioavailability via inhalation is 11 to 45% (mean 31%). The elimination half-life of CBD is 18–32 hours. Cannabidiol is metabolized in the liver as well as in the intestines by the cytochrome P450 enzymes CYP2B6, CYP2C19, CYP2D6, CYP2J2, and CYP3A4, and by the isoenzymes UGT1A7, UGT1A9, and UGT2B7, forming a variety of metabolites such as 7-hydroxycannabidiol as well as the 6α- and 6β-hydroxy isomers and derivatives hydroxylated on the alkyl side chain, followed by glucuronidation. CYP3A4 facilitates decarbonylation of CBD to liberate carbon monoxide, a bioactive gasotransmitter and pharmaceutical candidate. CBD may have a wide margin in dosing.

Pharmaceutical preparations
Nabiximols (brand name Sativex), an oromucosal spray made of a complex botanical mixture containing cannabidiol (CBD), delta-9-tetrahydrocannabinol (THC), and additional cannabinoid and non-cannabinoid constituents from cannabis sativa plants, was approved by Health Canada in 2005, to treat central neuropathic pain in multiple sclerosis, and in 2007, for cancer-related pain. In New Zealand, Sativex is "approved for use as an add-on treatment for symptom improvement in people with moderate to severe spasticity due to multiple sclerosis who have not responded adequately to other anti-spasticity medication."

Epidiolex is an orally administered cannabidiol solution. It was approved in 2018, by the US Food and Drug Administration (FDA) for treatment of two rare forms of childhood epilepsy, Lennox–Gastaut syndrome and Dravet syndrome, and seizures associated with tuberous sclerosis complex. In the US, it is approved in these indications for patients one year of age and older.

Chemistry
At room temperature, cannabidiol is a colorless crystalline solid. In strongly basic media and the presence of air, it is oxidized to a quinone. Under acidic conditions it cyclizes to THC, which also occurs during pyrolysis, but not during combustion (smoking). The synthesis of cannabidiol has been accomplished by several research groups.

Biosynthesis

Cannabis produces CBD-carboxylic acid through the same metabolic pathway as THC, until the next to last step, where CBDA synthase performs catalysis instead of THCA synthase.

Isomerism

Pyrolysis 
In the typical operating temperature range of e-cigarettes, 25–52% of CBD is transformed into other chemical substances: Δ9-THC, Δ8-THC, cannabinol and cannabichromene as predominant pyrolysates. From a chemical point of view, CBD in e-cigarettes can be considered as a precursor of THC.

History
Efforts to isolate the active ingredients in cannabis were made in the 19th century. Cannabidiol was studied in 1940 from Minnesota wild hemp and Egyptian Cannabis indica resin. The chemical formula of CBD was proposed from a method for isolating it from wild hemp. Its structure and stereochemistry were determined in 1963.

Plant breeding
Selective breeding of cannabis plants has expanded and diversified as commercial and therapeutic markets develop. Some growers in the US succeeded in lowering the proportion of CBD-to-THC to accommodate customers who preferred varietals that were more mind-altering due to the higher THC and lower CBD content. In the US, hemp is classified by the federal government as cannabis containing no more than 0.3% THC by dry weight. This classification was established in the 2018 Farm Bill and was refined to include hemp-sourced extracts, cannabinoids, and derivatives in the definition of hemp.

Society and culture

Foods and beverages

Food and beverage products containing cannabidiol were widely marketed in the United States as early as 2017. Hemp seed ingredients which do not naturally contain THC or CBD (but which may be contaminated with trace amounts on the outside during harvesting) were declared by the US Food and Drug Administration (FDA) as generally recognized as safe (GRAS) in December 2018. CBD itself has not been declared GRAS, and under US federal law is illegal to sell as a food, dietary supplement, or animal feed. State laws vary considerably as non-medical cannabis and derived products have been legalized in some jurisdictions in the 2010s.

The global market size for CBD was predicted to exceed billion by 2028.

Similar to energy drinks and protein bars which may contain vitamin or herbal additives, food and beverage items can be infused with CBD as an alternative means of ingesting the substance. In the United States, numerous products are marketed as containing CBD, but in reality contain little or none. Some companies marketing CBD-infused food products with claims that are similar to the effects of prescription drugs have received warning letters from the FDA for making unsubstantiated health claims. In February 2019, the New York City Department of Health announced plans to fine restaurants that sell food or drinks containing CBD, beginning in October 2019.

Sports
Cannabidiol has been used by professional and amateur athletes across disciplines and countries, with the World Anti-Doping Agency removing CBD from its banned substances list. The United States Anti-Doping Agency and United Kingdom-Anti-Doping Agency do not have anti-CBD policies, with the latter stating that, "CBD is not currently listed on the World Anti-Doping Agency Prohibited List. As a result, it is permitted to use in sport, though the intended benefits are unclear and not backed by clinical evidence. All other cannabinoids (including but not limited to cannabis, hashish, marijuana, and THC) are prohibited in-competition. The intention of the regulations is to prohibit cannabinoids that activate the same receptors in the brain as activated by THC." In 2019, the cannabis manufacturer, Canopy Growth, acquired majority ownership of BioSteel Sports Nutrition, which is developing CBD products under endorsement by numerous professional athletes. The National Hockey League Alumni Association began a project with Canopy Growth to determine if CBD or other cannabis products might improve neurological symptoms and quality of life in head-injured players. Numerous professional athletes use CBD, primarily for treating pain.

Legal status

Australia
Prescription medicine (Schedule 4) for therapeutic use containing two percent (2.0%) or less of other cannabinoids commonly found in cannabis (such as ∆-THC). A Schedule 4 drug under the SUSMP is a Prescription Only Medicine, or Prescription Animal Remedy – Substances, the use or supply of which should be by or on the order of persons permitted by state or territory legislation to prescribe and should be available from a pharmacist on prescription.

In June 2020, the Australian Therapeutic Goods Administration (TGA) published a consultation on a proposal to pave the way to make "low dose" CBD available to consumer/patients via pharmacists only through moving products from Schedule 4 to 3. Any products sold would need to have their safety, quality and efficacy pre-assessed by the TGA and be formally approved for sale (details to be outlined by TGA). They would be made available to over 18s only, with the maximum daily dose of 60mg/day, up to 2% THC finished product allowed, 30-day maximum supply, plant-derived or synthetic. This proposal is based on an initial literature review on the safety of low dose CBD published by the TGA in April 2020. Epidyolex was approved for the adjunctive therapy of seizures associated with Lennox–Gastaut syndrome or with Dravet syndrome in September 2020.

Bulgaria

In 2020, Bulgaria became the first country in the European Union to allow retail sales of food products and supplements containing CBD, despite the ongoing discussion within the EU about the classification of CBD as a novel food. However, there exists a legal gap because of the lack of a legally-permissible minimum amount of THC in the products containing cannabinoids.

Canada
In October 2018, cannabidiol became legal for recreational and medical use by the federal Cannabis Act. , CBD products in Canada could only be sold by authorized retailers or federally licensed medical companies, limiting their access to the general public. Nonetheless, with online delivery services and over 2,600 authorized cannabis retail stores , accessibility has steadily increased over time. The Canadian government states that CBD products "are subject to all of the rules and requirements that apply to cannabis under the Cannabis Act and its regulations." It requires "a processing licence to manufacture products containing CBD for sale, no matter what the source of the CBD is, and that CBD and products containing CBD, such as cannabis oil, may only be sold by an authorized retailer or licensed seller of medical CBD." Edible CBD products were scheduled to be permitted for sale in Canada on October 17, 2019, for human consumption.

, it was still illegal to carry cannabis and cannabis-derived products (including products containing CBD) across the Canadian border. If one carries any amount of cannabis for any purpose (including medical), it needs to be declared to the Canada Border Services Agency. Not declaring it is a serious criminal offence.

European Union

In 2019, the European Commission announced that CBD and other cannabinoids would be classified as "novel foods", meaning that CBD products would require authorization under the EU Novel Food Regulation stating that because "this product was not used as a food or food ingredient before May 15, 1997, before it may be placed on the market in the EU as a food or food ingredient, a safety assessment under the Novel Food Regulation is required." The recommendation – applying to CBD extracts, synthesized CBD, and all CBD products, including CBD oil – was scheduled for a final ruling by the European Commission in March 2019. If approved, manufacturers of CBD products would be required to conduct safety tests and prove safe consumption, indicating that CBD products would not be eligible for legal commerce until at least 2021. In December 2020, the European Commission concluded that CBD should not be considered as drug and can be qualified as food.

Cannabidiol is listed in the EU Cosmetics Ingredient Database (CosIng). However, the listing of an ingredient, assigned with an INCI name, in CosIng does not mean it is to be used in cosmetic products or is approved for such use.

Several industrial hemp varieties can be legally cultivated in Western Europe. A variety such as "Fedora 17" has a cannabinoid profile consistently around 1%, with THC less than 0.3%.

Hong Kong
In 2022, the HKSAR Government proposed a ban on any use of cannabidiol (including for academic research and by medical professionals) within the Hong Kong territory, making Hong Kong the first jurisdiction in the world to have complete prohibition of cannabidiol, starting from February 1, 2023, in part due to the possible presence of THC which is illegal in Hong Kong, according to a research subsidized by the Hong Kong SAR Government.

New Zealand
In 2017, the New Zealand government made changes to the regulations so that restrictions would be removed, which meant a doctor was able to prescribe cannabidiol to patients.

The passing of the Misuse of Drugs (Medicinal Cannabis) Amendment Act in December 2018 means cannabidiol is no longer a controlled drug in New Zealand, but is a prescription medicine under the Medicines Act, with the restriction that "the tetrahydrocannabinols (THCs) and specified substances within the product must not exceed 2 percent of the total CBD, tetrahydrocannabinol (THC) and other specified substances."

Russian Federation
According to a document received in response to an appeal to the Ministry of Internal Affairs of the Russian Federation, measures of state control in the Russian Federation regarding CBD have not been established. However, there is also a response from the Ministry of Health of the Russian Federation indicating that CBD can be considered as an isomer of restricted THC. The "isomer" argument is nonetheless vague, as   progesterone, which is freely sold in pharmacies, is also an isomer of THC, all three being . On February 17, 2020, the deputy of the Moscow City Duma Darya Besedina sent an official request to the Prime Minister of the Russian Federation Mikhail Mishustin with a request to eliminate that legal ambiguity by publishing official explanations and, if necessary, making required changes in the corresponding government decree.

Singapore
Singapore allows medical cannabis on a case-by-case basis, usually as a last resort drug. Each case is evaluated by the government, and largely comes in the form of Cannabidiol. However, the country is flexible to what is required for patient treatment, despite having some of the strictest drug laws in the world.

Sweden
Cannabidiol is classified as a medical product in Sweden. However, in July 2019, Supreme Court of Sweden ruled that CBD oil with any concentration of THC falls under the narcotic control laws.

Switzerland
While THC remains illegal, cannabidiol is not subject to the Swiss Narcotic Acts because it does not produce a comparable psychoactive effect. Cannabis products containing less than 1% THC can be sold and purchased legally.

Ukraine
On 7 April 2021 the Ukrainian government legalised use of isolated cannabidiol. Additionally, it approved Nabiximols, a cannabidiol-containing drug, for medical use.

United Kingdom
Cannabidiol, in an oral-mucosal spray formulation combined with delta-9-tetrahydrocannabinol, is a product available by prescription for the relief of severe spasticity due to multiple sclerosis (where other anti-spasmodics have not been effective) in the United Kingdom.

Until 2017, products containing cannabidiol marketed for medical purposes were classed as medicines by the UK regulatory body, the Medicines and Healthcare products Regulatory Agency (MHRA), and could not be marketed without regulatory approval for the medical claims. , cannabis oil is legal to possess, buy, and sell in the UK, providing the product does not contain more than 1 milligram of THC and is not advertised as providing a medicinal benefit.

In January 2019, the UK Food Standards Agency indicated it would regard CBD products, including CBD oil, as a novel food having no history of use before May 1997, and stated that such products must have authorisation and proven safety before being marketed. The deadline for companies with existing products to submit a full and validated novel foods application with the FSA was 31 March 2021; failure to do so before this date would exclude those companies from selling CBD. New products containing CBD after this deadline would require a fully approved application.

In February 2020, the UK FSA advised vulnerable people, such as pregnant women, breastfeeding mothers, and those already taking medication for other medical concerns not to take CBD. The FSA further recommended that healthy adults should not consume more than 70mg CBD per day.

United Nations
Cannabidiol is scheduled under the Single Convention on Narcotic Drugs as cannabis.  International Narcotics Control Board reminds Member States that, at the reconvened sixty-third session of the Commission on Narcotic Drugs,
in December 2020, the States members of the Commission rejected the recommendation of WHO that a footnote be added to the entry for cannabis and cannabis resin in Schedule I of the 1961 Convention as amended to exempt from international control preparations containing predominantly CBD and not more than 0.2 per cent of delta-9-THC.

United States
, cannabidiol extracted from marijuana remains a Schedule I Controlled Substance, and is not approved as a prescription drug or dietary supplement or allowed for interstate commerce in the United States. CBD derived from hemp (with 0.3% THC or lower) is legal to sell as a cosmetics ingredient or for other purposes not regulated by the FDA, but cannot be sold under federal law as an ingredient in food, dietary supplement, or animal feed. It is a common misconception that the legal ability to sell hemp (which may contain CBD), and hemp extracts and derivatives (including CBD), makes CBD legal for sale as a supplement or medicine.

In September 2018, following its approval by the FDA for rare types of childhood epilepsy, the GW Pharmaceuticals drug Epidiolex was rescheduled (by the Drug Enforcement Administration) as a Schedule V drug to allow for its prescription use. Epidiolex still requires rescheduling in some states before it can be prescribed in those states.

In 2013, a CNN program that featured Charlotte's web cannabis brought increased attention to the use of CBD in the treatment of seizure disorders. Since then, 16 states have passed laws to allow the use of CBD products with a physician's recommendation (instead of a prescription) for treatment of certain medical conditions. This is in addition to the 30 states that have passed comprehensive medical cannabis laws, which allow for the use of cannabis products with no restrictions on THC content. Of these 30 states, eight have legalized the use and sale of cannabis products without requirement for a physician's recommendation. , CBD was not an FDA-approved drug eligible for interstate commerce, and the FDA encouraged manufacturers to follow procedures for drug approval.

Federal illegality has made it difficult historically to conduct research on CBD. Cannabidiol is currently the subject of an FDA investigational new drug evaluation, and is not considered legal as a dietary supplement or food ingredient, . CBD is openly sold in head shops and health food stores in some states where such sales have not been explicitly legalized.

State and local governments may also regulate cannabidiol. For example, the Massachusetts Department of Agricultural Resources issued a rule in June 2019 aligning state CBD regulations with FDA regulations. This means that although recreational marijuana is legal in the state, CBD cannot legally be sold in food or as a dietary supplement under state law.

Health concerns
In November 2019, the FDA issued concerns about the safety of cannabidiol, stating that CBD use has potential to cause liver injury, interfere with the mechanisms of prescription drugs, produce gastrointestinal disorders, or affect alertness and mood. In October 2020, the FDA updated its safety concerns about CBD, acknowledging the unknown effects of protracted use, how it affects the developing brain, fetus or infants during breastfeeding, whether it interacts with dietary supplements or prescription drugs, whether male fertility is affected, and its possible side effects, such as drowsiness.

Mislabeling and poisoning
Studies conducted by the FDA from 2014 through 2019 have determined that a majority of CBD products are not accurately labeled with the amount of CBD they contain. For example, a 2017 analysis of cannabidiol content in oil, tincture, or liquid vape products purchased online in the United States showed that 69% were mislabeled, with 43% having higher and 26% having lower content than stated on product labels.

In 2020, the FDA conducted a study of 147 CBD products and found that half contained THC.

, 1,085 people contacted US poison control centers about CBD-induced illnesses, doubling the number of cases over the 2018 rate and increasing by 9 times the case numbers of 2017. Of cases reported in 2019, more than 33% received medical attention and 46 people were admitted to a hospital intensive care unit, possibly due to exposure to other products, or drug interactions with CBD.

2018 Farm Bill and hemp
The 2014 Farm Bill legalized the sale of "non-viable hemp material" grown within states participating in the Hemp Pilot Program which defined hemp as cannabis containing less than 0.3% of THC. The 2018 United States Farm Bill removed the hemp plant and all "derivatives, extracts, cannabinoids, isomers, acids, salts, and salts of isomers, whether growing or not, with a delta-9 tetrahydrocannabinol concentration of not more than 0.3 percent on a dry weight basis,"  including CBD, from the Controlled Substances Act, making them legal to manufacture in the United States. The FDA retains regulatory authority over hemp-derived CBD, while the DEA is not involved in the regulation of legally-compliant hemp and hemp products. The 2018 Farm Bill requires that research and development of CBD for a therapeutic purpose would have to be conducted under notification and reporting to the FDA. In the United States, hemp-derived CBD is legal to sell for industrial purposes or as a cosmetics ingredient, but under FDA regulation it cannot be marketed for medical use or as an ingredient in food, dietary supplements, or animal feed.

FDA warning letters
From 2015 to November 2022, the FDA issued dozens of warning letters to American manufacturers of CBD products for false advertising and illegal interstate marketing of CBD as an unapproved drug to treat diseases, such as cancer, osteoarthritis, symptoms of opioid withdrawal, Alzheimer's disease, and pet disorders. Chemical analysis of CBD products found that many did not contain the levels of CBD claimed in advertising. In 2022, the FDA stated that "scientific studies show possible harm to the male reproductive system, including testicular atrophy, harm to the liver, and interactions with certain medications. The FDA has not found adequate information showing how much CBD can be consumed, and for how long, before causing harm. This is particularly true for vulnerable populations like children and those who are pregnant."

In December 2020, the Federal Trade Commission initiated a law enforcement crackdown on American companies marketing CBD products as unapproved drugs. The warning also applied to hemp CBD capsules and oil that were being marketed illegally while not adhering to the federal definition of a dietary supplement.

See also 
 Cannabidivarin (CBDV), a homolog of cannabidiol
 Hash oil
 Hemp oil
 List of investigational antipsychotics
 List of investigational analgesics

References

Further reading

External links 
 

5-HT1A agonists
Analgesics
Anti-inflammatory agents
Anticonvulsants
Phytocannabinoids
Cyclohexenes
CYP2D6 inhibitors
CYP3A4 inhibitors
Endocannabinoid reuptake inhibitors
Natural phenols
2,6-Dihydroxybiphenyls
Orphan drugs